Illinois Route 7 (IL 7, Illinois 7) is a northeast–southwest state route in northeastern Illinois. Currently, IL 7 runs from U.S. Route 6 (US 6) at Rockdale north through Joliet, and Crest Hill into Lockport, and then east to Orland Park before terminating at IL 43 in Worth.

Route description 

IL 7 follows large portions of the Southwest Highway, one of the original routes from Chicago to Joliet.

IL 7 runs along many major streets and overlaps several other routes. It joins with IL 53 in Crest Hill, US 30 (Plainfield Road) in Crest Hill and with US 6 at 159th Street between Lockport and Orland Park. Between Rockdale and Worth, IL 7 runs via old US 66, 159th Street, 143rd Street, Wolf Road, Southwest Highway, and Larkin Avenue, among many others.

History 
SBI Route 7 originally ran from East Moline to Chicago, mostly on current US 6 and IL 7. When US 6 was designated, IL 7 was dropped west of what is now Orland Park. In 1967, it was dropped in the city limits of Chicago (terminating in Oak Lawn, and also extended to IL 53 in Lockport. Two years later, it was extended to Rockdale. In 1970, the eastern end was cut back to its current terminus.

Major intersections

References

External links

 Illinois Highway Ends: Illinois Route 7

007
7
Transportation in Will County, Illinois
Transportation in Cook County, Illinois